Daphnella marmorata is a species of sea snail, a marine gastropod mollusk in the family Raphitomidae.

Description
The length of the shell attains 8 mm.

The whorls are flatly angulated around the upper part, elegantly cancellated with transverse and longitudinal striae. The  columella is striated at the base. The color of the shell is whitish, longitudinally zigzag marbled with chestnut.

Distribution
This marine species occurs off New Guinea and Queensland, Australia

References

 Hinds R. B. (1844-1845). Mollusca. In: The zoology of the voyage of H. M. S. "Sulphur", under the command of Captain Sir Edward Belcher, R. N., C. B., F. R. G. S., etc., during the years 1836-42. London: Smith, Elder and Co. v + 72 pp., 21 pls
 Reeve, L.A. 1845. Monograph of the genus Pleurotoma. pls 20–33 in Reeve, L.A. (ed). Conchologia Iconica. London : L. Reeve & Co. Vol. 1.
 Allan, J.K. 1950. Australian shells: with related animals living in the sea, in freshwater and on the land. Melbourne : Georgian House xix, 470 pp., 45 pls, 112 text figs.

External links
  Hedley, C. 1922. A revision of the Australian Turridae. Records of the Australian Museum 13(6): 213-359, pls 42-56 
 

marmorata
Gastropods described in 1844